The 2000 United States Senate election in Mississippi was held on November 7, 2000. Incumbent Republican U.S. Senator Trent Lott won re-election to a third term.

Major candidates

Democratic 
 Troy Brown, perennial candidate

Republican 
 Trent Lott, incumbent U.S. Senator first elected in 1988

Results

See also 
 2000 United States Senate elections

References 

2000
Mississippi
2000 Mississippi elections